Andrew E. Rubin is an American computer programmer, entrepreneur, and venture capitalist.  Rubin founded Android Inc. in 2003, which was acquired by Google in 2005; Rubin served as a Google vice president for 9 years and led Google's efforts in creating and promoting the Android operating system for mobile phones and other devices during most of his tenure.  Rubin left Google in 2014 after allegations of sexual misconduct, although it was presented as a voluntary departure rather than a dismissal at first.  Rubin then served as co-founder and CEO of venture capital firm Playground Global from 2015–2019.  Rubin also helped found Essential Products in 2015, a mobile phone start-up that closed in 2020 without finding a buyer.

Rubin was nicknamed "Android" by his co-workers at Apple in 1989 due to a love of robots, with the nickname eventually becoming the official name of the Android operating system.  Before Android Inc., Rubin also helped found Danger Inc. in 1999, another company involved in the mobile space; Rubin left Danger to work on Android in 2003, and Danger was eventually acquired by Microsoft in 2008.

In 2018, The New York Times published an article revealing the details of Rubin's 2014 departure from Google - that it had been forced rather than voluntary due to credible allegations he had sexually harassed female employees, and that Google had paid Rubin a $90 million severance package to expedite the process.  Google's large severance payment attracted significant controversy.

Early life and education
Rubin grew up in Chappaqua, New York as the son of a psychologist who later founded his own direct-marketing firm. His father's firm created photographs of the latest electronic gadgets to be sent with credit card bills. He attended Horace Greeley High School in Chappaqua, New York from 1977 until 1981 and was awarded a Bachelor of Science degree in computer science from Utica College, Utica, New York in 1986.

Career 
Andy Rubin worked at Apple from 1989 to 1992 as a manufacturing engineer.

General Magic 
Rubin joined General Magic in 1992. He worked for developing Motorola Envoy as a lead engineer.

Google
After Android was acquired by Google in 2005, Rubin became the company's senior vice president of mobile and digital content, where he oversaw development of Android, an open-source operating system for smartphones. On March 13, 2013, Larry Page announced in a blog post that Rubin had moved from the Android division to take on new projects at Google, with Sundar Pichai taking over Android. In December 2013, Rubin started management of the robotics division of Google (including companies such as Boston Dynamics, which Google owned at the time). On October 31, 2014, he left Google after nine years at the company to start a venture capital firm for technology startups.

Sexual harassment allegations
According to The New York Times, while the departure was presented to the media as an amicable one where Rubin would spend more time on philanthropy and start-ups, CEO Larry Page personally asked for Rubin's resignation after a sexual harassment claim by an employee against Rubin was found to be credible during an investigation by Google; the employee, with whom Rubin had an extramarital relationship, accused him of coercing her into oral sex in a hotel room in 2013. Rubin strongly disputed these reports and denied wrongdoing, stating, "these false allegations are part of a smear campaign to disparage me during a divorce and custody battle". The incident, among others, led to the 2018 Google walkouts from Google's employee workforce over Rubin reportedly receiving a $90 million "exit package" to expedite his separation from the company. Google responded by sending a memo to employees saying no employees dismissed due to sexual harassment concerns after 2016 had received payouts.

After Google
After being forced out of Google, Rubin founded Playground Global in 2015 along with Peter Barrett, Matt Hershenson and Bruce Leak. The company is a venture capital firm and studio for technology start-ups, providing funding, resources, and mentorship. In 2015, Playground Global raised a $300 million fund from investors including Google, HP, Foxconn, Redpoint Ventures, Seagate Technology and Tencent, among others. It has invested in several companies such as Owl Labs. Rubin left Playground Global in May 2019.

Rubin eventually joined and helped create the Android phone start-up Essential Products. In November 2017, he took a leave of absence from Essential Products after reports of the inappropriate relationship from his time at Google surfaced. In December 2017, he returned to Essential Products.

Rubin and his ex-wife, Rie Hirabaru Rubin, owned and operated Voyageur du Temps, a bakery and cafe in Los Altos, California, which closed in September 2018.

Timeline
 Carl Zeiss AG, robotics engineer, 1986–1989.
 Apple Inc., manufacturing engineer, 1989–1992.
 General Magic, engineer, 1992–1995. An Apple spin-off where he participated in developing Magic Cap, an operating system and interface for hand-held mobile devices.
 MSN TV, engineer, 1995–1999. When Magic Cap failed, Rubin joined Artemis Research, founded by Steve Perlman, which became WebTV and was eventually acquired by Microsoft.
 Danger Inc., co-founder, 1999–2003. Founded with Matt Hershenson and Joe Britt. The firm is most notable for the Danger Hiptop, branded for T-Mobile as the Sidekick, which is a phone with PDA-like abilities. The firm was later acquired by Microsoft in February 2008.
 Android Inc., co-founder 2003–2005. Android was acquired by Google in 2005.
 Google, 2005–2014: Senior Vice President in charge of Android for most of his tenure. Since December 2013, managing the robotics division of Google (which included companies bought by Google, such as Boston Dynamics).
 Playground Global, 2014–2019: Founder. This ventures focuses on artificial intelligence and it is creating new generations of hardware.
 Redpoint Ventures, 2015–2017: Partner.
 Essential Products, 2015–2020: Founder and lead. Rubin launched the Essential phone through this company in late June 2017. On February 12, 2020, Essential announced in an update on their blog that the company was ceasing operations.

References

External links

"Designing Products Your Customers Will Love", Andy Rubin speaks at Stanford University
"Android on the March", Financial Post September 17, 2010
"Android Invasion", Newsweek October 3, 2010

1963 births
American computer businesspeople
American computer programmers
American investors
American people of Jewish descent
American software engineers
American technology chief executives
American technology company founders
American venture capitalists
Apple Inc. employees
Businesspeople from New York (state)
Businesspeople in software
Google employees
Living people
People from Chappaqua, New York
Utica University alumni
Businesspeople from the San Francisco Bay Area
Horace Greeley High School alumni
Android (operating system)
Jewish engineers